is a Japanese comedian.

Career
Yamazaki was born in Kasukabe, Saitama. He formed the owarai kombi  with Hidetsugu Shibata in 1994 and became famous after winning the "M-1 Grand Prix" for manzai comedy in 2004. He has come to often appear alone on television and rarely appears together with Shibata, using the nickname "Zakiyama", especially after Shibata's bouts with health problems. He is a regular on many shows, including Nichiyō Geinin, which he hosts with Bakarhythm and Masayasu Wakabayashi.

Yamazaki is known to be a rowdy-type character and as a "troublemaker" and "mood-maker" as he often likes to go off script for additional comedic effects. He is also known for his imitations of other comedians, through exaggerations and adding in his own elements when performing their gags.

Filmography

TV Programmes

Current

References 

Japanese comedians
Living people
1976 births
People from Saitama Prefecture